Arronnes is a commune in the Allier department in the Auvergne-Rhône-Alpes region of central France.

The inhabitants of the commune are known as Arronnais or Arronnaises.

Geography
Access to the commune is by the D995 road from Cusset in the north-west passing through the heart of the commune and the village and continuing south-east to Ferrières-sur-Sichon. Apart from the village there are the hamlets of Les Fours, Doyat, Les Barlets, and Les Etangs in the south of the commune. There are substantial forests spread over the commune occupying about 60% of the land area with the balance farmland.

The Sichon river flows from the south-east to the north-west of the commune joined by its tributary the Vareille at the village and continuing north-west to join the Allier in Vichy.

Neighbouring communes and villages

Toponymy
First named in 1282: Arona from the pre-Celtic ar ("stream" or "water") and the Gallic onna meaning river.

Heraldry

Administration

List of Successive Mayors

Population

Distribution of Age Groups
Percentage Distribution of Age Groups in Arronnes and Allier Department in 2017

Source: INSEE

Sites and monuments
The Church of Saint-Léger (11th century). is registered as an historical monument. Built in granite, it once belonged to a Benedictine priory and the monks welcomed pilgrims who crossed the Bourbonnais mountains. In the church is a Bronze Bell from 1520 which is registered as a historical object.
A Peasant's House is located in a former farmhouse from the early 19th century.

See also
Communes of the Allier department

References

External links
Arronnes on the National Geographic Institute website 
Arronnes on Géoportail, National Geographic Institute (IGN) website 
Aronne on the 1750 Cassini Map

Communes of Allier